Feng-le Park is a metro station on the Green Line operated by Taichung Metro in Nantun District, Taichung, Taiwan.

The station name is taken from Fengle Sculpture Park, located nearby.

Station layout

References 

Taichung Metro
Railway stations in Taichung
Railway stations opened in 2020